Gunnar Friberg was a Swedish bandy player. Friberg was part of the Djurgården Swedish champions' team of 1908.

References

Swedish bandy players
Djurgårdens IF Bandy players
Year of birth missing
Year of death missing